Assel Kanay is a Kazakhstani karateka. She won one of the bronze medals in the women's 61kg event at the 2021 Islamic Solidarity Games held in Konya, Turkey.

In 2021, she competed in the women's 68kg event at the World Karate Championships held in Dubai, United Arab Emirates. She won one of the bronze medals in her event at the 2021 Asian Karate Championships held in Almaty, Kazakhstan.

Achievements

References

External links 
 

Living people
Year of birth missing (living people)
Place of birth missing (living people)
Kazakhstani female karateka
Islamic Solidarity Games medalists in karate
Islamic Solidarity Games competitors for Kazakhstan
21st-century Kazakhstani women